Félix Arcadio Montero Monge (1850, Santo Domingo – June 5, 1897) was a lawyer, a politician, and a union leader in Costa Rica.

1850 births
1897 deaths
People from Santo Domingo (canton), Costa Rica
Costa Rican politicians
Trade unionists
19th-century Costa Rican lawyers